Ennasheri Malanada Temple is the only Dushasana Temple in South India. It is located at Thekkemuri of Sooranad North village in Kunnathur Taluk of Kollam district (Kerala State), India. This place is the northern border of Kollam district which Pathanamthitta and Alappuzha districts share the boundaries. The temple is located equidistant from Adoor (M C Road) to the Northeast and Sasthamkotta to the Southeast. It is also reachable from Kayamkulam and Karunagappally on the NH 47 and Kottarakkara (via Puthoor or Enathu) on the MC road (approximately 27 km from each centre)

Malakkuda Festival 
The annual festival at Malanada is known as ‘Malakkuda’. It is celebrated during the summer, Third Sunday of Malayalam month 'Kumbham'കുംഭം  every year. The arrival of the festival is proclaimed by ‘Kodiyettu’ (the temple flag hoisting ceremony by Oorali after due observance) on the second Sunday of Kumbham. Presently, although there is festivity for 8 days from Kodiyettu to Malakkuda, there is no change in the rituals connected therewith.

See also
Sooranad North

References

Hindu temples in Kollam district